Plasse Dennis Bradford Conway (August 4, 1932 to November 13, 2006) was an American professional wrestler, better known by his ring name, Tiger Conway.

Professional wrestling career
Conway was born on August 4, 1932, in Shreveport, Louisiana. He grew up living on a plantation with his parents and moved to Houston, Texas in 1947, where he worked in a hotel. At the hotel, he met wrestler Danny McShain, who helped him get involved in wrestling.

In the 1950s, when Conway made his debut, professional wrestling was segregated and people competed against others of their own race. Conway was forced to compete against only other African Americans for much of his career. Conway was forced to wrestle on the "chitterling circuit", named after the innards of pigs that slave owners refused to eat and gave to their slaves instead. Conway won his only title, the Texas Negro Championship, in his first professional match.

By the 1960s, Conway was permitted to compete against Caucasians. In a match against Maurice "Mad Dog" Vachon, Vachon broke Conway's kneecap. Later in his career, Conway formed a tag team with his son, who competed as Tiger Conway Jr.

Personal life 
Conway was a member of the Cauliflower Alley Club, an organization for retired wrestlers and boxers. After his retirement from wrestling, he operated a fence-building business and was a member of the Christian Alliance for Humanitarian Aid, Inc. board of directors.

Conway married Inita Conway, and they remained married until his death 56 years later. In November 2006, Conway suffered a stroke and brain aneurysm. He died on November 13, 2006 in Houston.

Championships and accomplishments
NWA Southwest Sports
NWA Texas Negro Championship (1 time)
Professional Wrestling Hall of Fame and Museum
Class of 2021

References

External links 
 

1932 births
2006 deaths
20th-century African-American sportspeople
21st-century African-American people
African-American male professional wrestlers
American male professional wrestlers
People from Shreveport, Louisiana
Professional Wrestling Hall of Fame and Museum
Professional wrestlers from Louisiana